Ajan Sangarli (also Romanized as Ājan Sangarlī and ‘Ajan Sangarlī) is a village in Aq Su Rural District, in the Central District of Kalaleh County, Golestan Province, Iran. At the 2006 census, its population was 1,391, in 340 families.

References 

Populated places in Kalaleh County